The 1911 Dartmouth football team was an American football team that represented Dartmouth College as an independent during the 1911 college football season. In its first season under head coach Frank Cavanaugh, the team compiled an 8–2 record, shut out five of ten opponents, and outscored all opponents by a total of 137 to 19. Edward Daley was the team captain.

Schedule

References

Dartmouth
Dartmouth Big Green football seasons
Dartmouth football